Fritz García Gallont (born 9 August 1955) is a Guatemalan politician. He is a member of the Unionist Party. He served as Minister of Communications under President Álvaro Arzú. He served as Mayor of Guatemala City from 2000 to 2004. In 2003, his bid for the presidency was unsuccessful.

References

People from Guatemala City
1955 births
Living people
Communications ministers of Guatemala
Mayors of Guatemala City
Unionist Party (Guatemala) politicians